Palestine–Sweden relations are bilateral relations between the State of Palestine and Sweden. Sweden recognized Palestine as a sovereign state on 30 October 2014. Palestine has an embassy in Stockholm, which opened in February 2015.

History 
Sweden voted in favor of the United Nations plan for the partition of Palestine in 1947. Folke Bernadotte, a Swede, was a United Nations mediator in the Arab–Israeli conflict and put forward a peace plan before he was assassinated by Zionist terrorists who accused him of favoring the Arabs. Sweden also mediated the US's lifting of the ban on holding direct talks with the PLO.

In October 2014, Sweden recognised Palestinian statehood after the Social Democratic Party won a plurality in the 2014 general election. Palestinians and their supporters welcomed Sweden's decision, viewing it as a significant step towards achieving international recognition for Palestine.

See also 
 Folke Bernadotte

References 

Sweden
Palestine